Phegaea or Phegaia may refer to either of two demoi of ancient Attica:
Phegaea (Aigeis), a deme of the Aigeis phyle
Phegaea (Pandionis), a deme of the Pandionis phyle